The 2011 China League Two season is the 22nd season since its establishment in 1989. League kicked off on 8 May 2011 and ended on 24 November 2011.

Clubs

Managerial changes

Group Stage Standings

North Group

South Group

Group Stage results

North Division

South Division

Play-offs

Quarter-finals

First legs

Second legs

Semi-finals

First legs

Second legs

Third-place play-off

2011 China League Two 3rd-placed team faces 2011 China League One 14th-placed team for a play-off match. The winner will earn a spot in the 2012 China League One. See 2011 China League One#Relegation play-off.

Final

Notes and references

External links
Official site 
News and results at Sohu 

3
China League Two seasons